William, son of Freskin (died c. 1203), Lord of Duffus and Strathbrock, was a Scoto-Flemish noble.

He was the eldest son of Freskin, a Flemish settler who arrived in Scotland in the reign of King David I of Scotland. William obtained a grant from King William I of Scotland, of the lands of Strathbrock in West Lothian, as well as Duffus, Roseisle, Inchkeil, Machir and Kintrae in Moray, between 1165 and 1171.

Marriage and issue
William is known to have had the following issue:
Hugh de Moravia of Duffus and Strathbrock, had issue.
William de Moravia of Petty, Bracholy, Boharm and Arteldol (died c. 1226), married a daughter of David de Olifard, had issue.
Andrew de Moravia, parson of Duffus.

References

12th-century Scottish people
12th-century births
Year of birth unknown
1200s deaths
Year of death uncertain
Moray
People associated with West Lothian
De Moravia family
Clan Murray
Clan Sutherland
Scottish people of French descent
People of Flemish descent